Sin Newspaper (Student Independent News) is a student newspaper in Galway, Ireland.  Its offices are based at the University of Galway. Sin is published fortnightly and covers news about Galway events on and off campus, while its entertainment and features sections aim to entertain and provoke debate and shape opinion. Sin accepts articles from past and present students and lecturers and staff. Sin was founded in 2001 and replaced the University College Galway student periodical Unity, which was published from 1959 until the late 1990s. Sin was printed in tabloid size across 32 pages until 2020 when it moved online due to the Covid-19 pandemic.

Online presence
The Sin website, Sin.ie, hosts a gallery, the University message boards, newspaper archives and links to the Sin E-zine titled "Sin Byte".

Recognition
In 2009, Sin and Sin.ie received nominations for Best Website, Best Features Education, Best Colour Writer and Editor of the Year in Smedia awards.

Notable past stories
On 9 December 2008, Ministers Eamon O'Cuiv and Batt O'Keefe were the subject of a protest by a small group of students who were highlighting the issue of third level fees. During Minister O'Cuiv's attempt to enter the Quadrangle to meet with University authorities, the students attempted to block his entrance. The minister engaged in a scuffle and was seen to forcibly grab a student protester, which was photographed by the Sin editor. The photograph was used on the RTÉ News website, The Irish Times and appeared in many other local and national papers and news sites. The story was picked up by the national press and the minister was forced to explain his actions in the photograph.

Sin also reported on an incident that took place on 2 February 2009 when former Taoiseach Bertie Ahern was prevented from speaking at the university's Literary and Debating Society, again by a small group of protesters involved in the free fees movement. Sin had a full report of the incident on its website within twenty minutes of the incident; the report was cited in several of the subsequent local and national coverage of the incident.

Following the controversial RAG week of 2009, Sin and Sin.ie provided comprehensive coverage of the University's decision to withdraw support and NUI Galway Students' Union commitment to continue running the charity week in future years.

See also
 Flirt FM

References

External links
 Sin.ie - official website
 NUI Galway Students' Union - official website

Mass media in County Galway
University of Galway
Publications established in 2001
Student newspapers published in the Republic of Ireland